Szlichtyngowa  (German: Schlichtingsheim) is a town in western Poland, in the Wschowa County of the Lubuskie Voivodship, near the Oder river.

The population as of 2019 was 1,278.

History

The town was founded in 1644 by a Polish Protestant activist and Sejm deputy Jan Jerzy Szlichtyng and was named after him Szlichtyngowa/Schlichtingsheim. From 1634 he bought lands in the vicinity of the village of Górczyna in Greater Poland near the border with Silesia, with the intention of establishing a town for religious refugees from Silesia during the Thirty Years' War. It obtained town rights from the Polish King Władysław IV Vasa, by virtue of a privilege issued in Kraków in July 1644.

After the Second Partition of Poland in 1793 it was annexed by Prussia. It was regained by Poles in 1807 to be included in the short-lived Duchy of Warsaw and in 1815 it was re-annexed by Prussia. The town was then subjected to Germanisation. It was part of the Fraustadt district in the Province of Posen. From 1871, it was part of Germany. A railway station was built in 1906. Despite belonging to the historic Greater Poland, i.e. the cradle of the Polish state, after Poland regained independence in 1918, it remained in Germany under the Treaty of Versailles, because it was almost entirely populated by Germans. With the dissolution of the Province of Posen, it became part of the Prussian Province of Posen-West Prussia, within which it remained until 1938, when it became part of the Province of Silesia and in 1941, Lower Silesia.

In spring 1945, the town was captured by the Red Army and after the defeat of Nazi Germany in World War II, it was finally reunited with Poland. The largely abandoned town was repopulated with Poles from the nearby Leszno and Rawicz counties, those returning from forced labour from Germany, as well as those expelled from eastern Polish territories, annexed by the Soviet Union. The remaining German population was expelled by the local Polish administrative authorities.

References

Sources
Geographical Dictionary of the Kingdom of Poland vol. XI p. 959

External links
Official town webpage
Jewish Community in Szlichtyngowa on Virtual Shtetl

Cities and towns in Lubusz Voivodeship
Wschowa County
Populated places established in 1644

it:Szlichtyngowa